Khovaling District or Nohiya-i Khovaling (/) is a district in Khatlon Region, Tajikistan. Its capital is the village Khovaling. The population of the district is 57,900 (January 2020 estimate).

Administrative divisions
They are as follows:

References

Districts of Khatlon Region
Districts of Tajikistan